Malmoe is a rural locality in the North Burnett Region, Queensland, Australia.

History 
Malmoe State School opened in August 1914. In 1928 it was renamed O'Bil Bil State School. It closed circa 1964.

References 

North Burnett Region
Localities in Queensland